Jeremy Nova Buckingham (born 22 November 1973 in Tasmania) is a former Australian politician. He was a member of the New South Wales Legislative Council from 2011 to 2019.  He was a Greens member from 2011 to 2018, but resigned from the party on 20 December 2018. He was unsuccessful in retaining his seat in the Legislative Council in the 2019 state election.

Personal life
Buckingham was born in Launceston, Tasmania and spent his early life living in the historic homestead 'Hillgrove', adjacent to the Taroona Shot Tower site south of Hobart. He attended Taroona Primary, Taroona High School and graduated from The Hobart College. After school he spent two years working as a benchman in a small country sawmill run by Kim Booth (later a Greens member of the Tasmanian House of Assembly) in central Tasmania.

In 1994 Buckingham fronted heavy metal band Amplifire as singer, with other band members including his brother Jessie 'Tambo' Buckingham, as well as Michael Kelly, Brett Collidge and John Salter.

Buckingham moved to Sydney in the mid 1990s, where he worked as forklift driver, hardware store salesman and builders' labourer.

Buckingham relocated to Orange in the central west of New South Wales in 1997, where he worked as production manager for monumental stonemason McMurtrie & Co. In his time at the stonemason, Buckingham worked on public works such as the Australian War Memorial in London, the Federation Square project and the Sydney Olympic Games site.

After a back injury rendered him unfit for heavy lifting, Buckingham enrolled and completed an Advanced Diploma in Ecological Agriculture and Land Management at the University of Sydney, which he completed in 2006. He continued to work as a stonemason until his election to state parliament in 2011.

Buckingham was married to Sarah Bradbury from 2000 until 2017. In 2020 Buckingham married Crystal Buckingham.

The Greens
Buckingham unsuccessfully contested the state Legislative Assembly seat of Orange in the 2003 and 2007 state elections. Buckingham was elected to the City of Orange council in 2004 and re-elected with an increased vote in 2008. He was the first member of the Australian Greens elected to a council west of the Great Dividing Range. As a councillor, he implemented Australia's first stormwater harvesting project for drinking water supply, initiated the city's first statement of commitment to the Aboriginal community, fought against homophobia and for the rights of same sex couples, campaigned to protect an agricultural research station from developers, and fought to protect water supplies from the Cadia gold mine that operates on the outskirts of Orange.

Buckingham was elected convenor of the Central West Greens in 2008, a position which he held until 2011.

Buckingham was the sixth candidate on the Greens' Senate ticket for the 2004 Australian federal election. He contested the lower house seat of Calare in the 2007 and 2010 federal elections without success. Buckingham was then preselected to third spot on the Greens' Legislative Council ticket in the 2011 state election. He was locked in a close race with Pauline Hanson and the Nationals for the final spots. After preferences were distributed he was elected with 2,437 votes ahead of Pauline Hanson, and 1,306 votes ahead of Sarah Johnston of the National Party.

Since being elected, Buckingham has campaigned against the expansion of the coal and coal seam gas (CSG) industries in New South Wales and Australia. He has managed to build broad links across both sides of politics in the CSG campaign, and has made a personal ally of conservative radio show host Alan Jones who alongside Buckingham was sued by the former leader of the National Party (Andrew Stoner) for defamation.

Buckingham initiated Australia's first parliamentary inquiry into coal seam gas. Buckingham introduced bills into the NSW Parliament attempting to restrict mining. The "Coal Seam Gas Moratorium Bill 2011" sought a moratorium on the granting of exploration licences for coal seam gas. The "Responsible Mining (Protecting Land, Water and Communities) Bill 2012" seeking to prohibit exploration and mining of minerals and petroleum in urban areas, National Parks, and drinking water catchments.

For the Greens, he held the portfolios of Mining and Resources, Primary Industries, Trade and Investment, Regional Infrastructure and Services, Agriculture, Health and Sport.

Alongside former Greens leader Christine Milne, Buckingham had set up a country arm of the Greens party and was convenor of the Australian Country Greens.

In October 2016, Buckingham tabled a motion in response to U.S. presidential candidate Donald Trump's recently leaked statements. This included the phrase stating the NSW parliament "agrees with those who have described Mr Trump as 'a revolting slug' unfit for public office". The president of the upper house, Don Harwin, found the term "revolting slug" was not unparliamentary language. The motion was passed.

In November 2018 Greens MP Jenny Leong used parliamentary privilege to accuse Jeremy Buckingham of sexual violence toward a staff member whose job he then allegedly threatened, and following this the Greens NSW State Delegates Council passed a motion calling for Buckingham to resign due to violations of their sexual harassment policy. In retaliation Buckingham threatened other party members and candidates with defamation proceedings if they supported the former staff member.

Independent
In December 2018, Buckingham resigned from the Greens NSW. His resignation followed a motion passed by more than three quarters of the Greens' branches asking that he step down from the 2019 election ticket following an allegation of sexual assault and other claims of internal bullying. Buckingham claimed that the allegations had seen party processes "abused and co-opted for factional purposes" and that the allegations had not been substantiated.

Buckingham described the party as "toxic", and said the NSW Greens had "abandoned the core principles they were founded on" and were more focused on "bringing down capitalism" and "divisive identity politics" than acting on climate change. He said that as an independent, he would run on a “real green” platform to “challenge the party’s Marxist agenda”.

Buckingham contested the 2019 election as an independent in Legislative Council. He ran on a platform of climate action and pressuring the market on gas. He also said he would team up with an independent candidate who would run against Jenny Leong in the lower house seat of Newtown.

Buckingham was unsuccessful in retaining his seat at the election. He announced on 26 March 2019 that he would retire from public life.

Legalise Cannabis Party
In February 2023, the Legalise Cannabis Party announced that Buckingham would lead its Legislative Council ticket for the 2023 NSW Election.

See also
Members of the New South Wales Legislative Council, 2011–2015
Members of the New South Wales Legislative Council, 2015–2019

References

External links

1973 births
Living people
Australian Greens members of the Parliament of New South Wales
Members of the New South Wales Legislative Council
Politicians from Launceston, Tasmania
University of Sydney alumni
21st-century Australian politicians